This is the complete episode listing for the anime adaptation of the visual novel Soul Link. The 12-episode series was animated by Picture Magic, with music composed by Hiroyuki Sawano.

List of episodes

Theme songs
Opening
"Screaming" by Miyuki Hashimoto

Ending
"Dust Trail" by Miyuki Hashimoto

References

Lists of anime episodes